Southern Pacific 786 is a preserved 2-8-2 "Mikado" type steam locomotive that was constructed at the American Locomotive Company's Brooks Works in New York. It was used to pull mainline freight trains by the Texas and New Orleans Railroad, a subsidiary of the Southern Pacific Railroad, until it was removed from service in 1955, and it was donated to the city of Austin, Texas the following year. Beginning in 1989, No. 786 was leased to the Austin Steam Train Association, who restored it to operating condition, and the locomotive was used to pull excursion trains on the Austin Western Railroad until 1999. Since 2000, crews have been performing an extensive rebuild on No. 786 to bring it back to service, and as of 2023, the rebuild continues to progress.

History

Revenue service 
In the 1910s, the Southern Pacific Railroad (SP) designed a new class of 2-8-2 "Mikado" type locomotives for one of their sibsidiary companies, the Houston and Texas Central Railway (H&TC). This new class was the MK-5 class, which consisted of fifty-seven locomotives. No. 786 was the twelfth of twenty MK-5s to be ordered from the American Locomotive Company's (ALCO) Brooks Locomotive Works in Dunkirk, New York, and it was constructed in August 1916. The following year, 1917, No. 786 was transferred to another SP subsidiary, the Texas and New Orleans Railroad (H&TC), and they subsequently assigned No. 786 to pull mixed freight trains on their mainline trackage between Houston, Austin, and Galveston. The locomotive received multiple modifications while being overhauled for several times during revenue service, including its original extended smokebox being shortened in the 1920s, its boiler pressure being increased from 200 to 210 pounds per square inch on March 1, 1931, and a reception of a worthington feedwater heater system and superheaters on November 29, 1941. After serving the T&NO for thirty-nine years, No. 786 was retired in late 1955. On March 24, 1956, No. 786 was donated to the city of Austin for static display purposes, and it would remain at a vacant lot behind the Central Fire Station between 4th and 5th Streets for the next thirty-four years.

Excursion service 
In 1989, the Austin Steam Train Association (ASTA) was incorporated with the intention of recreating historic passenger railroading in Central Texas. The ASTA, being led by Arthur U. Boone, subsequently approached an agreement with the city of Austin to lease No. 786 to restore it to operating condition. In February 1990, No. 786 was moved from its display site to the Westinghouse Motor Company in Georgetown. Four months later, a team of both professional and volunteer crews began performing an extensive rebuild on the locomotive under the supervision of Robert Franzen and Gary Bensman. The initial restoration on No. 786 lasted less than two years. In December 1991, No. 786 made its first test runs by pulling one passenger car toward downtown Austin to take part in a celebratory festival. It wasn't until July 25, 1992, when No. 786 pulled its first official passenger excursion train between Burnet and the ASTA's location in Cedar Park. Since its first official inaugural run, No. 786 has pulled several excursion trains over the Austin Western Railroad (AWR), including the occasional Hill County Flyer train. No. 786 was also featured in the video, "What Do You Want To Be When You Grow Up? The Railroaders Edition". For the next seven years, the locomotive had operated for the ASTA for over 60,000 miles while carrying thousands of passengers. In July 1999, No. 786 was removed from excursion service after crews discovered cracks in its cylinder saddles.

21st century rebuild 
In October 2000, the city of Cedar Park began donating thousands of dollars to the ASTA, with $205,658.61 to rebuild No. 786. The locomotive was soon disassembled, with the boiler being lifted onto wooden blocks, and the sections of the frame were separated to be sandblasted before all of the locomotive's components were shipped by truck to the Steam Operations Corporation (SOC) of Muscle Shoals, Alabama. The ASTA had contracted SOC and the Strasburg Rail Road to help construct two brand new cylinder saddles for No. 786, since the original saddles were found to be corroded beyond economical repair. The locomotive's boiler was also being rebuilt at the Historic Machinery's shop in Steele, since the firebox had been worn out and needed to be refurbished, and the flues, tubes, superheaters, and staybolts needed to be replaced. By the end of 2008, New cylinder saddles had been cast, and they were machined in order to fit onto the frame. The driving wheels were sent to the Tennessee Valley Railroad Museum in Chattanooga, Tennessee to be fitted with new tires. During the spring of 2009, a new smokebox section has been fabricated, a new trailing axle has been cast, and every remaining original part that was still in good condition was sandblasted and machined. By the beginning of 2010, the rebuild on the locomotive's boiler has been completed, and it has passed a hydro test. In December 2011, the cylinder saddles have been permanently mounted onto the rest of the locomotive frame.

In the spring of 2013, all of No. 786's components have been shipped by truck back to Cedar Park with the hopes of beginning the reassembly process of the locomotive's class 5 rebuild. As the 2010s progressed, the smokebox door was reinstalled onto the boiler, the frame was covered to be protected from the weather and elements, the wheels were painted black, and any corroded component on No. 786's tender was replaced. As of 2023, the rebuilding process on No. 786 is still in progress. The frame has been completely painted, the cab is being rebuilt, and the boiler has been re-primed. The locomotive will likely be operational again within a few years.

See also 

 Southern Pacific 745 (Another preserved SP MK-5 class locomotive)
 Southern Pacific 2467
 Southern Pacific 2472
 Santa Fe 1316
 Santa Fe 3415
 Oregon Railroad and Navigation 197

References

External links 

 Austin Steam Train Association website

2-8-2 locomotives
Individual locomotives of the United States
786
Tourist attractions in Austin, Texas
Preserved steam locomotives of Texas
Standard gauge locomotives of the United States
Railway locomotives introduced in 1916